Al-Khwarizmi is a lunar impact crater located on the far side of the Moon. It lies to the southeast of the crater Moiseev, and northeast of Saenger.

The western inner wall of Al-Khwarizmi is much wider than along the eastern side. The eastern rim overlays a pair of craters, including Al-Khwarizmi J. The outer wall is somewhat distorted from a circular shape, including a double-rim in the south. There is a small central peak at the midpoint, which forms part of a low ridge that bends to the northeast. Several tiny craterlets lie in the northern part of the interior floor. The floor to the southeast is somewhat smoother and free of significant impacts.

The crater was named for the Persian mathematician and astronomer Muhammad ibn Musa al-Khwarizmi.

Satellite craters

By convention these features are identified on lunar maps by placing the letter on the side of the crater midpoint that is closest to Al-Khwarizmi.

References

 El-Baz, Farouk. "Al-Khwarizmi: A New-Found Basin on the Lunar Far Side". Science, New Series, Vol. 180, No. 4091 (Jun. 15, 1973), pp. 1173–1176. Published by: American Association for the Advancement of Science.

External links

Al-Khwarizmi at The Moon Wiki

Impact craters on the Moon